"Antoinette Blue" is the ninth single released by Nana Kitade. It was used as the fourth ending theme for the anime D.Gray-man. The first press of this single comes with trading cards and stickers from D.Gray-man. The title is a reference to Marie Antoinette, who was famous for having a grey-blue diamond ring. The single gained moderate success and lead-up to her first best of album entitled, Berry Berry Singles. The single reached #34 on the Oricon chart and stayed on the chart for a total of five weeks. Two years Later it was featured on her 2009 3rd full-length album Bondage as track #4.

Video information
The music video for "Antoinette Blue" starts out with showing a dark castle, with a bright full moon behind it and the song's title flashes on the screen. It then starts to give the viewer a closer look at the castle, and even takes them inside on the highest towers. In the tower there is a skeleton of a young girl sitting in a chair. As the moonlight shines on the corpse, it begins to move, and skin appears on it. It gets up and is revealed to be Kitade, who starts singing emotionally.

Track listing
 Antoinette Blue (アントワネットブルー)
 Wish in the Blood
 Kamisama Hitotsu Dake (神様ひとつだけ; Only One God)
 Antoinette Blue: D.Gray-man Ending Ver. (アントワネットブルー)
 Antoinette Blue (Instrumental) (アントワネットブルー)

2007 singles
Nana Kitade songs
Songs written by Nana Kitade
2007 songs